Trunovskoye is a rural locality (a selo) in Trunovsky District of Stavropol Krai, Russia. Population:

References

Rural localities in Stavropol Krai